The Statute Law (Repeals) Act 1976 (c 16) is an Act of the Parliament of the United Kingdom.

This Act was partly in force in Great Britain at the end of 2010.

It implemented recommendations contained in the seventh report on statute law revision, by the Law Commission and the Scottish Law Commission.

Section 1 - Repeals and associated amendments
Section 1(1) was repealed by Group 2 of Part IX of Schedule 1 to the Statute Law (Repeals) Act 1998.

Section 2 - Savings
Section 2(3) was repealed by Group 2 of Part IX of Schedule 1 to the Statute Law (Repeals) Act 1998.

Section 3 - Extent
In section 3(2), the words from "or Isle of Man" to the end were repealed by Group 2 of Part IX of Schedule 1 to the Statute Law (Repeals) Act 1998.

The power conferred by section 3(2) was exercised by
The Statute Law (Repeals) Act 1976 (Colonies) Order 1979 (SI 1979/111)
The Statute Law Repeals (Isle of Man) Order 1984 (SI 1984/1692).

The Orders in Council made under section 3(2) have lapsed because of the repeal made to that section by the Statute Law (Repeals) Act 1998.

Schedule 1 - Enactments repealed
This Schedule was repealed by Group 2 of Part IX of Schedule 1 to the Statute Law (Repeals) Act 1998.

Schedule 2 - Amendments

Part I
In the entry relating to the Inebriates Act 1898, the words "and the Licensing (Scotland) Act 1959, section 160" were repealed by section 1(1) of, and Part XVII of Schedule 1 to, the Statute Law (Repeals) Act 1978.

The entry relating to the Licensing (Scotland) Act 1903 was repealed by section 1(1) of, and Part XIX of Schedule 1 to, the Statute Law (Repeals) Act 1977.

Part II
The entry relating to the Civil Defence Act 1939 was repealed by section 32(2) of, and Schedule 3 to, the Civil Contingencies Act 2004.

The entry relating to the Miscellaneous Financial Provisions Act 1955 was repealed by section 1(1) of, and Part XIX of Schedule 1 to, the Statute Law (Repeals) Act 1977.

The entry relating to the Protection of Birds Act 1967 was repealed by section 73(1) of, and Part II of Schedule 17 to, the Wildlife and Countryside Act 1981.

See also
Statute Law (Repeals) Act

References
Halsbury's Statutes. Fourth Edition. 2008 Reissue. Volume 41. Page 792.
The Public General Acts and General Synod Measures 1976. HMSO. London. 1977. Part I. Page 155.
Peter Allsop (General editor). Current Law Statutes Annotated 1976. Sweet & Maxwell, Stevens & sons. London. W Green & son. Edinburgh. 1976. Volume 1.
HL Deb vol 366, col 756 and 1331, vol 369, col 1290, HC Deb vol 910, cols 112 to 113.

External links
The Statute Law (Repeals) Act 1976, as amended from the National Archives.
The Statute Law (Repeals) Act 1976, as originally enacted from the National Archives.

United Kingdom Acts of Parliament 1976